On 5 February 2018, 29-year-old Rabbi Itamar Ben Gal from Har Brakha, was stabbed to death at the Ariel Junction, near the West Bank Israeli settlement and city of Ariel. The assailant had escaped from the scene, but was arrested following a six-week manhunt.  A protester was killed during a violent demonstration against searching for the suspect.

Incident 
The attack occurred at a bus stop at the Ariel Junction, on Highway no. 5. An Israeli civilian was attacked by a man who stabbed him multiple times in the upper body.

The perpetrator is said to have decided to kill a Jew during an argument with a policeman at a road junction near Ariel.  He purchased two knives, each 27-centimeters-long, at a store in Nablus, and returned to the junction.  There, he identified Rabbi Ben Gal as a Jew due to the fact that he was wearing a kippah.  He attacked Ben Gal, and gave chase when Ben Gal ran away.  The perpetrator was stopped from pursuing his victim when he was struck by a passing car.

Perpetrator 
Abed al-Karim Adel Assi (alt. Abd al-Hakim Asi), a 19 year-old Israeli Arab resident of Jaffa, was behind the attack. His parents are separated. Assis' father lives in Nablus; his mother lives in Haifa. Assis is known to have resided at one time in a home for at-risk youth and to have received social services aid over the years.

Manhunt 

During the manhunt for Assi, there were clashes between Israeli forces and Palestinian rioters in the city of Nablus, and the Palestinian Health Ministry reported that a Palestinian man, Khaled Tayeh, died.

The six-week manhunt ended with capture of the perpetrator.

Legal proceedings
Assi was indicted for murder and charged with selecting his victim because he was a Jew.

He was convicted.

See also 
List of terrorist incidents in February 2018
List of violent incidents in the Israeli–Palestinian conflict, 2018

References 

2018 in the State of Palestine
2018 murders in Asia
February 2018 crimes in Asia
Palestinian terrorism
Stabbing attacks in 2018
Terrorist incidents in Asia in 2018
Terrorist incidents in the West Bank in 2018
Terrorist incidents involving knife attacks